Burn-Up Excess is a Japanese anime television series directed by Shinichiro Kimura and animated by Magic Bus. It aired from 1997 to 1998 for a total of 13 episodes. Four volumes were released on VHS and DVD in North America by ADV Films.

The series is a tongue-in-cheek look at a special operations unit in the Tokyo police force called "Team Warrior", with large amounts of fan service thrown in for good measure, exemplified by the inclusion of ADV's trademarked "Jiggle Counter" on the DVDs along with Plastic Little.

Plot summary
The story revolves around Rio Kinezono, a buxom member of Team Warrior who consistently overspends her paycheck, but is also a top-flight martial artist and a valuable member of the team. In the field, Rio is usually flanked by Maya Jingu, the green-haired team sniper who appears to have a serious lust for ranged weapons (specifically assault rifles). Their antics are backed up by the inventions of Nanvel Candlestick, the exotic team engineer whose job is to devise and implement special combat and surveillance hardware for the team's use. Lilica Ebett, the sprightly pink-haired girl who's a computer expert, can pretty much crack into any information system, and Yuji Naruo, a perverted, camera-toting voyeur, always serves as Warrior's drop-operation pilot and driver. Maki Kawasaki, the mysterious, bespectacled superintendent, is charged with commanding Warrior in the field and administering their various missions as they arise.

The series chronicles the team members' adventures as they slowly track down a sinister city plot involving the manufacture and distribution of military armaments.

It was preceded by the AIC's OVA miniseries Burn-Up W, although there are some inconsistencies with several elements, the most notable of which is the malevolent and calculating Ruby, who seems to be a completely different character altogether in Burn-Up Excess, despite the two anime being considered canon.

Characters

Main characters

Team Warrior
Rio Kinezono

This busty blonde is the main protagonist of the series. She's trained in martial arts and is always the person leading an attack. She likes to look good and loves buying pretty things. Unfortunately, her spending habits keep her in eternal debt, so she's always looking for good-paying jobs to support her lifestyle. She has a desk job working for the police in Policetown and counts on work with Team Warrior to pay her bills. Always trying to find the easy way out, she tries to hook up with any rich guy she can find in the hopes that he'll be able to buy her all the pretty things she desires.

Maki Kawazaki

Team Warrior's commander and a no-nonsense type of leader. She was awarded the command to distract her from her investigation into Black Diamonds. She married fellow investigator Masato who was killed in an explosion on a boat on their wedding day.

Lilica Ebett

The computer expert of the group, with pink hair done up in bows. Lilica is usually seen in a control room and has the ability to hack into computer systems and provide intelligence support to the rest of the group.

Maya Jingu

Maya loves her guns and treats them like her men. She has green hair and is almost always seen wearing a headband.

Nanvel Candlestick

Team Warrior's resident engineering wizard. She is the one responsible for creating a lot of the high-tech gadgets the team uses. She has a bad habit of coloring her creations either purple or pink.

Yuji Naruo

Yuji is the only male in the group and the team's vehicle expert. He has a crush on Rio, much to her chagrin. He is a lover of female legs and undergarments and a great example of a hentai (pervert). He has a bad habit of showing up in the girls' locker room while they're either changing or taking a shower.

Rio's boss
Rio's boss is always pushing Rio to finish her work. She tries to use her charms on him to let her off the hook.

Neo Tokyo Police
Miyuki
Miyuki is Rio's friend from the police academy. She works as a traffic cop.

Miyuki's boss
Just like Rio, Miyuki is constantly in trouble with her boss.

Other characters

Osaka
Jingu Syndicate
A crime syndicate in Osaka run by Maya's father.

Maya's father
The boss of the Jingu crime syndicate in Osaka.

Bob
The redheaded member of the Jingu crime syndicate in Osaka.

Ken
A chubby guy who wears glasses and is a member of the Jingu crime syndicate in Osaka.

Tommy
A member of the Jingu crime syndicate in Osaka.

Yamada
A tall guy who wears glasses and is a member of the Jingu crime syndicate in Osaka.

Gondo Construction
An aggressive company bent on land development in Osaka and eliminating the Jingu crime syndicate.

Neo Tokyo
Ramen shop owners
The couple that owns the ramen shop next to Police Town. They have two children, a boy and a girl.

Chi Mama
The leader of a group of cross-dressing thieves and owner of a nightclub. He generally refers to Rio by a pet name of "Stephanie".

Underwear thief
A masked thief who travels around Tokyo, stealing women's underwear, but he is actually a cram school student.

Prince Hasan
The heir to a powerful oil company in the Middle East. he arrives in Tokyo and requests protection from the Warriors. Rio hoped to marry him and get him to pay off her debts until she found out that he is a pervert.

Thunderstorm
A group that wants to kill Prince Hasan to cause disorder in the Middle East.

Henry
An advanced strategic tank with artificial intelligence and multiple forms of advanced weaponry, from standard machine guns to a large pulse cannon capable of destroying an entire division of standard tanks in seconds. One of Team Warrior's missions is to escort Henry from Japan to Switzerland.

Antagonists
Ruby
Ruby is the woman that coordinates much of the criminal activity against which Team Warrior fights. It is apparent that she has a considerable amount of funding for her criminal operations. She visits Tokyo to host a fashion show disguised as designer Miriam Bardo. She is also very adept in hand-to-hand combat.

Harry
Ruby's boss and with scars on his hand and face. He was the husband of Maki whose hand was scarred when he saved her from a crazed gunman. He was supposedly killed in an explosion on a boat on their wedding day. He survived and turned to crime and the underworld, becoming an international arms dealer.

Drone bugs
Used by the Ruby and the Dawn Mirage to take over Neo Tokyo Tower.

Shiguru Tomoyama
Former prime minister of Japan who becomes involved with the production of mechanized police and military personnel.

Mecha Cops
The Mecha Cops are robotic police manufactured by the Sukurada factory under the control of the former prime minister Shiguru Tonoyama and sold to the Neo Tokyo police. They have advanced artificial intelligence with black diamond CPUs, and are impervious to most normal weaponry. They are designed to subdue criminals using non-lethal force. They have many other features, including the ability to run faster than speeding cars and interface directly with computer systems in Police Town for quick data retrieval.

Nanvel's inventions
As the group's electronics expert, Nanvel's job is to design and build machines to help the team achieve its goals.
Pin-Ele
Pin-Ele is a giant pink elephant that Nanvel advertises as an Optical Diet Machine. It is able to project a hologram over someone to make that person look slimmer. People who want to change their looks wear receptors shaped like flowers on their heads and Pin-Ele transmits the new images to those receptors which are then projected over their wearers. During the series, she builds three versions of the machine, each smaller than the last. The final version is so small that it can be carried around by one person.

Pink Cockroach
A pink device the size and shape of a cockroach, designed to sneak into inaccessible locations and transmit audio and video back to the team. It can also be used as a communications device. Nanvel also states that if the cockroach's wings are opened, it can be used as a hand grenade although this function is never demonstrated.

Pink Rabbit
This is a giant pink robot shaped like a rabbit. Nanvel rides in a large glass bubble that makes the rabbit's head. It doesn't have any weapons, but it has heavy armor and is able to punch, kick, and shoot its hands off like pop guns. She uses the rabbit to help fight the super androids in the last episode.

Episode list
Episodes 8 to 12 contain short segments at the end of each episode called "Yiji's Additional Theater", mainly focusing on Yuji's attempts to film the female characters in their underwear.

References

External links
AIC page
Culture Publishers page
ADV Films page

1997 anime television series debuts
Action anime and manga
ADV Films
Anime International Company
Comedy anime and manga
Madman Entertainment anime
Magic Bus (studio)
Police in anime and manga

ja:BURN-UP